Claire Rommer (born Klara Romberger; 7 December 1904 – 19 August 1996) was a German stage and film actress.

Selected filmography
 The Queen of Whitechapel  (1922)
 The Anthem of Love (1922)
 Der Herzog von Aleria (1923)
 Judith (1923)
 The Great Industrialist (1923)
 The Fake Emir (1924)
 The Third Watch (1924)
 Playing with Destiny (1924)
 The Man at Midnight (1924)
 A Dangerous Game (1924)
 Wallenstein (1925)
 People in Need (1925)
 The Iron Bride (1925)
 Love Story (1925)
 The Salesgirl from the Fashion Store (1925)
 Ash Wednesday (1925)
 The Third Squadron (1926)
 In Treue stark (1926)
 Circus Romanelli (1926)
 Torments of the Night (1926)
 Eternal Allegiance (1926)
 Her Highness Dances the Waltz (1926)
 The Woman from the Folies Bergères (1927)
 Circle of Lovers (1927)
 Children's Souls Accuse You (1927)
 One Plus One Equals Three (1927)
 The City of a Thousand Delights (1927)
 Herkules Maier (1928)
 Orient (1928)
 Mikosch Comes In (1928)
 The Carousel of Death  (1928)
 When the Guard Marches (1928)
 Leontine's Husbands (1928)
 Death Drive for the World Record (1929)
 Scapa Flow (1930)
 Weekend in Paradise (1931)
Peace of Mind (1931)
 The Battle of Bademunde (1931)
 Ash Wednesday (1931)
 All is at Stake (1932)
 A Thousand for One Night (1933)

Bibliography
 Jung, Uli & Schatzberg, Walter. Beyond Caligari: The Films of Robert Wiene. Berghahn Books, 1999.

External links

1904 births
1996 deaths
German film actresses
German silent film actresses
Actresses from Berlin
20th-century German actresses